The Lithuania women's national under-17 football team is the national under-17 football team of Lithuania and is governed by the Lithuanian Football Federation.

Lithuania women's national under-17 football team is set to compete in 2018 UEFA Women's Under-17 Championship which will be held in Lithuania.

FIFA Women's Under-17 World Cup

UEFA Women's Under-17 Championship

See also 

 Lithuania women's national football team

References

External links
Official Team website
Official LFF website
FIFA profile

under-17
Women's national under-17 association football teams